Alligator Hunt is a shoot 'em up arcade game released by Spanish company Gaelco in 1994.

Gameplay 

Reptilian-looking aliens are invading earth and is up to the bravest soldiers (skateboarding kids) to stop the invasion and destroy the enemy base. Features gameplay similar to Cabal and Blood Bros..

Development and release 

Alligator Hunt was developed by Gaelco.

As of April 2020, the rights to Alligator Hunt were acquired by Piko Interactive. The game was included as part of the Gaelco Arcade 1 compilation for Evercade, marking its first console debut.

Reception 
According to Spanish website MeriStation, Alligator Hunt sold few arcade units. Carlos Forcada of MeriStation gave the game a positive retrospective outlook.

References

External links 
 Alligator Hunt at GameFAQs
 Alligator Hunt at Killer List of Videogames
 Alligator Hunt at MobyGames

1994 video games
Arcade video games
Evercade games
Gaelco games
Rail shooters
Video games developed in Spain
Cabal shooters
Multiplayer and single-player video games